Clint Independent School District is a public school district in eastern El Paso County, Texas (US).

The Clint Independent School District serves the town of Clint, a portion of Horizon City, and a small section of Socorro, as well as the census-designated places of Agua Dulce, Butterfield, most of Homestead Meadows North, Homestead Meadows South, and Morning Glory. It also includes the "East Montana" area.

Clint Independent School District's superintendent is Juan I. Martinez.

In 2009, the school district was rated "academically acceptable" by the Texas Education Agency.

Schools

High schools
Grades 9-12
Clint High School
Horizon High School
Mountain View High School
Clint ISD Early College Academy

Middle schools
Grades 6-8
Clint Junior High School
East Montana Middle School
Horizon Middle School

Elementary schools
Grades PK-5
Desert Hills Elementary School
Montana Vista Elementary School
Red Sands Elementary School
William D. Surratt Elementary School
Carroll T. Welch Elementary School
Frank Macias Elementary School

See also
List of school districts in Texas

References

External links
Clint ISD
 (1998 only)

School districts in El Paso County, Texas